Sheizaf is a mixed religious-secular community settlement in southern Israel. Located around 25 kilometres south of Beersheba, it falls under the jurisdiction of Ramat HaNegev Regional Council.

History
The village was founded on 8 February 2012 by ten families. Initially an unofficial settlement, it was declared illegal by a Beersheba District Court in November 2014 as it had been established on land planned for a student village, but Interior Minister Gideon Sa'ar overruled the decision and granted formal recognition to the village.

References

Community settlements
Populated places in Southern District (Israel)
Populated places established in 2012
2012 establishments in Israel